Hongyazi Township is a primarily sectored township in Pingluo County, Shizuishan, Ningxia, China. , Hongyazi Township has jurisdictions over the following seven villages:
Hongyazi Village
Wangjiagou Village
Wuduizi Village
Shuiquanzi Village
Sankeliu Village
Hongxiang New Village
Hongrui Village

, Hongyazi Village had 1494 people and 416 households, roughly a third of them Hui Muslims. The main crops cultivated were wheat, maize, sunflower seeds and oil, and the average income per capita amounted to $786.

References 

Pingluo County
Township-level divisions of Ningxia